The Milwaukee Brewers' 2010 season was the 41st season for the franchise in Milwaukee, the 13th in the National League, and 42nd overall.

Regular season

April
The Brewers began the 2010 season with a loss at Miller Park to the Colorado Rockies in Yovani Gallardo's first career Opening Day start. The Brewers recovered to win the series, however, on the strength of two saves by Trevor Hoffman and a solid start from newcomer Randy Wolf. In the following series against the St. Louis Cardinals, Hoffman squandered two ninth-inning leads though he was bailed out the second time by third baseman Casey McGehee's walk-off home run to avoid being swept.  The game was also noteworthy, because the Brewers overcame a home run by Albert Pujols.  Although Pujols would hit 8 home runs against the Brewers in 2010, the Brewers would win 6 of those 7 contests. Milwaukee then lost series to the Chicago Cubs and the Washington Nationals. In the lone win of the Nationals series, the Brewers scored ten runs in the first inning, the franchise's first ten-run inning in nearly nine years.

The Brewers took that offensive firepower to Pittsburgh, where, in a three-game sweep, they outscored the Pirates 36–1, including a historic 20–0 drubbing in the finale. The 20-run margin tied a club record for margin of victory and was the most one-sided shutout win in Brewers history. The series run differential tied for the third largest all-time. The team could not keep up the record pace, though, and returned to Milwaukee to get swept by the Cubs, then to lose two of three against the Pirates, to whom the Brewers had not lost at Miller Park in the previous 22 Milwaukee meetings. Hoffman continued to struggle, blowing consecutive save opportunities in a 17-hour span as the Brewers hitters sputtered to end the month as well. The Brewers lost seven of their last eight games in April to finish the month with a 9–14 record.

Left fielder Ryan Braun recorded a .355 batting average with five home runs and 20 RBIs and Casey McGehee hit .305 with five homers and 19 RBIs to lead the way for the Brewers' offense, while mighty first baseman Prince Fielder could only muster a .244 average and did not hit a home run until his 54th at bat, a career-long season-opening drought. Gallardo and Wolf each notched two wins in the season's opening month to set the pace for Milwaukee pitchers. Veteran Jeff Suppan, the Brewers' Opening Day starter in 2009, was removed from the rotation after two disappointing starts in favor of Chris Narveson.

May
The month of May was rocky for the Brewers when they rode a 9-game losing streak, the longest since 2006 when they lost 10 in a row.

Season standings

Record vs. opponents

Game log

|- align="center" bgcolor="ffbbbb"
| 1 || April 5 || Rockies || 5–3 || Jiménez (1–0) || Gallardo (0–1) || Morales (1) || 45,808 || 0–1
|- align="center" bgcolor="bbffbb"
| 2 || April 6 || Rockies || 7–5 || Wolf (1–0) || Smith (0–1) || Hoffman (1) || 37,344 || 1–1
|- align="center" bgcolor="bbffbb"
| 3 || April 7 || Rockies || 5–4 || Coffey (1–0)|| Cook (0–1) || Hoffman (2) || 35,793 || 2–1
|- align="center" bgcolor="ffbbbb"
| 4 || April 9 || Cardinals || 5–4 || Reyes (1–0) || Hoffman (0–1) || Franklin (2) || 34,018 || 2–2
|- align="center" bgcolor="ffbbbb"
| 5 || April 10 || Cardinals || 7–1 || García (1–0) || Gallardo (0–2) || || 42,039 || 2–3
|- align="center" bgcolor="bbffbb"
| 6 || April 11 || Cardinals || 8–7 || Hoffman (1–1) || McClellan (0–1) || || 33,294 || 3–3
|- align="center" bgcolor="ffbbbb"
| 7 || April 12 || @ Cubs || 9–5 || Dempster (1–0) || Davis (0–1) || || 41,306 || 3–4
|- align="center" bgcolor="ffbbbb"
| 8 || April 14 || @ Cubs || 7–6 || Gray (1–0) || Hawkins (0–1) || Mármol (3) || 39,565 || 3–5
|- align="center" bgcolor="bbffbb"
| 9 || April 15 || @ Cubs || 8–6 || Narveson (1–0) || Samardzija (0–1) || Hoffman (3) || 38,026 || 4–5
|- align="center" bgcolor="ffbbbb"
| 10 || April 16 || @ Nationals || 5–3 || Bruney (1–0) || Hawkins (0–2) || Capps (5) || 17,234 || 4–6
|- align="center" bgcolor="ffbbbb"
| 11 || April 17 || @ Nationals || 8–0 || Hernández (2–0) || Wolf (1–1) || || 18,673 || 4–7
|- align="center" bgcolor="bbffbb"
| 12 || April 18 || @ Nationals || 11–7 || Vargas (1–0) || Marquis (0–3) || || 18,789 || 5–7
|- align="center" bgcolor="bbffbb"
| 13 || April 20 || @ Pirates || 8–1 || Bush (1–0) || Morton (0–3) || || 9,386 || 6–7
|- align="center" bgcolor="bbffbb"
| 14 || April 21 || @ Pirates || 8–0 || Gallardo (1–2) || Duke (2–1) || || 12,192 || 7–7
|- align="center" bgcolor="bbffbb"
| 15 || April 22 || @ Pirates || 20–0 || Wolf (2–1) || McCutchen (0–2) || || 13,634 || 8–7
|- align="center" bgcolor="ffbbbb"
| 16 || April 23 || Cubs || 8–1 || Dempster (2–0) || Suppan (0–1) || || 37,848 || 8–8
|- align="center" bgcolor="ffbbbb"
| 17 || April 24 || Cubs || 5–1 || Lilly (1–0) || Davis (0–2) || || 43,410 || 8–9
|- align="center" bgcolor="ffbbbb"
| 18 || April 25 || Cubs || 12–2 || Wells (2–0) || Bush (1–1) || || 38,634 || 8–10
|- align="center" bgcolor="bbffbb"
| 19 || April 26 || Pirates || 17–3 || Gallardo (2–2) || Duke (2–2) || || 25,892 || 9–10
|- align="center" bgcolor="ffbbbb"
| 20 || April 27 || Pirates || 7–3 || Donnelly (2–0) || Hoffman (1–2) || || 28,991 || 9–11
|- align="center" bgcolor="ffbbbb"
| 21 || April 28 || Pirates || 6–5 (14) || Carrasco (1–0) || Parra (0–1) || || 28,401 || 9–12
|- align="center" bgcolor="ffbbbb"
| 22 || April 29 || @ Padres || 9–0 || LeBlanc (2–0) || Davis (0–3) || || 16,696 || 9–13
|- align="center" bgcolor="ffbbbb"
| 23 || April 30 || @ Padres || 3–0 || Richard (1–2) || Bush (1–2) || Bell (7) || 29,366 || 9–14

|- align="center" bgcolor="bbffbb"
| 24 || May 1 || @ Padres || 2–1 || Gallardo (3–2) || Latos (1–2) || Hoffman (4) || 25,619 || 10–14
|- align="center" bgcolor="ffbbbb"
| 25 || May 2 || @ Padres || 8–0 || Garland (3–2) || Wolf (2–2) || || 20,074 || 10–15
|- align="center" bgcolor="bbffbb"
| 26 || May 4 || @ Dodgers || 11–6 || Narveson (2–0) || Kershaw (1–2) || || 50,714 || 11–15
|- align="center" bgcolor="bbffbb"
| 27 || May 5 || @ Dodgers || 11–3 || Davis (1–3) || Billingsley (2–0) || || 35,659 || 12–15
|- align="center" bgcolor="ffbbbb"
| 28 || May 6 || @ Dodgers || 7–3 || Broxton (2–0) || Hawkins (0–3) || || 38,456 || 12–16
|- align="center" bgcolor="bbffbb"
| 29 || May 7 || @ Diamondbacks || 3–2 || Gallardo (4–2) || Jackson (1–4) || Hoffman (5) || 27,067 || 13–16
|- align="center" bgcolor="bbffbb"
| 30 || May 8 || @ Diamondbacks || 17–3 || Wolf (3–2) || Valdez (1–1) || || 26,877 || 14–16
|- align="center" bgcolor="bbffbb"
| 31 || May 9 || @ Diamondbacks || 6–1 || Narveson (3–0) || Kennedy (2–2) || || 25,358 || 15–16
|- align="center" bgcolor="ffbbbb"
| 32 || May 10 || Braves || 8–2 || Hanson (3–2) || Davis (1–4) || || 24,365 || 15–17
|- align="center" bgcolor="ffbbbb"
| 33 || May 11 || Braves || 11–3 || Hudson (3–1) || Bush (1–3) || || 30,678 || 15–18
|- align="center" bgcolor="ffbbbb"
| 34 || May 12 || Braves || 9–2 || Lowe (5–3) || Parra (0–2) || || 30,175 || 15–19
|- align="center" bgcolor="ffbbbb"
| 35 || May 14 || Phillies || 9–5 || Moyer (5–2) || Wolf (3–3) || || 41,706 || 15–20
|- align="center" bgcolor="ffbbbb"
| 36 || May 15 || Phillies || 10–6 || Blanton (1–2) || Narveson (3–1) || Contreras (1) || 43,069 || 15–21
|- align="center" bgcolor="ffbbbb"
| 37 || May 16 || Phillies || 4–2 || Hamels (4–2) || Bush (1–4) || Romero (1) || 37,023 || 15–22
|- align="center" bgcolor="ffbbbb"
| 38 || May 17 || @ Reds || 6–3 || Cueto (3–1) || Coffey (1–1) || Cordero (13) || 12,409 || 15–23
|- align="center" bgcolor="ffbbbb"
| 39 || May 18 || @ Reds || 5–4 || Fisher (1–1) || Hoffman (1–3) || || 17,697 || 15–24
|- align="center" bgcolor="ffbbbb"
| 40 || May 19 || @ Pirates || 6–4 || López (1–0) || Wolf (3–4) || Dotel (9) || 9,526 || 15–25
|- align="center" bgcolor="bbffbb"
| 41 || May 20 || @ Pirates || 4–3 || Narveson (4–1) || Maholm (3–4) || Villanueva (1) || 13,975 || 16–25
|- align="center" bgcolor="ffbbbb"
| 42 || May 21 || @ Twins || 15–3 || Blackburn (1–5) || Bush (1–5) || || 38,737 || 16–26
|- align="center" bgcolor="ffbbbb"
| 43 || May 22 || @ Twins || 8–7 (12) || Crain (1–0) || Parra (0–3) || || 39,152 || 16–27
|- align="center" bgcolor="bbffbb"
| 44 || May 23 || @ Twins || 4–3 || Parra (1–3) ||  Pavano (4–5) || Axford (1) || 38,952 || 17–27
|- align="center" bgcolor="bbffbb"
| 45 || May 25 || Astros || 6–1 || Wolf (4–4) || Paulino (0–7) || || 27,363 || 18–27
|- align="center" bgcolor="ffbbbb"
| 46 || May 26 || Astros || 5–0 || Oswalt (3–6) || Narveson (4–2) || || 30,151 || 18–28
|- align="center" bgcolor="bbffbb"
| 47 || May 27 || Astros || 4–3 (10) || Axford (1–0) || Lindstrom (1–1) || || 34,355 || 19–28
|- align="center" bgcolor="bbffbb"
| 48 || May 28 || Mets || 2–0 || Gallardo (5–2) || Igarashi (0–1) || || 32,773 || 20–28
|- align="center" bgcolor="bbffbb"
| 49 || May 29 || Mets || 8–6 ||Coffey (2–1) || Nieve (1–3) || Axford (2) ||37,841 || 21–28
|- align="center" bgcolor="ffbbbb"
| 50 || May 30 || Mets ||10–4 ||Dickey (2–0) || Suppan (0–2) || ||36,559 || 21–29
|- align="center" bgcolor="ffbbbb"
| 51 || May 31 || @ Marlins || 13–5 || Sosa (1–0) || Narveson (4–3) || || 10,115 || 21–30

|- align="center" bgcolor="ffbbbb"
| 52 || June 1 || @ Marlins || 6–4 || Nolasco (5–4) ||Hoffman (1–4)  || Núñez (11) ||11,202 || 21–31
|- align="center" bgcolor="bbffbb"
| 53 || June 2 || @ Marlins || 7–4 ||Gallardo (6–2)  || Sosa (1–1)  ||Axford (3)   ||11,468 || 22–31
|- align="center" bgcolor="ffbbbb"
| 54 || June 3 || @ Marlins || 3–2 || Johnson (6–2) || Capuano (0–1) || Núñez (12) || 11,717 || 22–32
|- align="center" bgcolor="ffbbbb"
| 55 || June 4 || @ Cardinals || 8–0 || Wainwright (8–3) ||Wolf (4–5)  || || 43,261 || 22–33
|- align="center" bgcolor="ffbbbb"
| 56 || June 5 || @ Cardinals || 5–4 (11) || Boggs (1–2) || Axford (1–1) || || 44,180 || 22–34
|- align="center" bgcolor="bbffbb"
| 57 || June 6 || @ Cardinals || 4–3 (10) || Braddock (1–0) || Motte (2–2) || Axford (4) || 40,467 || 23–34
|- align="center" bgcolor="bbffbb"
| 58 || June 8 || Cubs || 3–2 || Axford (2–1) || Mármol (1–1) || || 30,082 || 24–34
|- align="center" bgcolor="ffbbbb"
| 59 || June 9 || Cubs || 9–4 || Zambrano (2–4) || Wolf (4–6) || || 30,326 || 24–35
|- align="center" bgcolor="bbffbb"
| 60 || June 10 || Cubs || 5–4 (10) || Axford (3–1) || Howry (1–1) || || 36,363 || 25–35
|- align="center" bgcolor="bbffbb"
| 61 || June 11 || Rangers || 6–2 || Narveson (5–3) || Harden (3–3) || || 33,099 || 26–35
|- align="center" bgcolor="ffbbbb"
| 62 || June 12 || Rangers || 4–3 || Feldman (4–6) || Parra (1–4) || Ray (1) || 39,791 || 26–36
|- align="center" bgcolor="ffbbbb"
| 63 || June 13 || Rangers || 7–2 || Lewis (6–4) || Gallardo (6–3) || || 36,059 || 26–37
|- align="center" bgcolor="bbffbb"
| 64 || June 14 || @ Angels || 12–2 || Wolf (5–6) || Saunders (5–7) || || 39,289 || 27–37
|- align="center" bgcolor="bbffbb"
| 65 || June 15 || @ Angels || 7–1 || Bush (2–5) || Santana (6–5) || || 37,484 || 28–37
|- align="center" bgcolor="ffbbbb"
| 66 || June 16 || @ Angels || 5–1 || Piñeiro (6–6) || Narveson (5–4) || || 37,416 || 28–38
|- align="center" bgcolor="ffbbbb"
| 67 || June 18 || @ Rockies || 2–0 || Hammel (5–3) || Parra (1–5) || Corpas (9) || 32,340 || 28–39
|- align="center" bgcolor="ffbbbb"
| 68 || June 19 || @ Rockies || 8–7 || Belisle (2–3) || Braddock (1–1) || Betancourt (1) || 39,192 || 28–40
|- align="center" bgcolor="bbffbb"
| 69 || June 20 || @ Rockies || 6–1 || Hoffman (2–4) || Corpas (1–4) || || 46,511 || 29–40
|- align="center" bgcolor="bbffbb"
| 70 || June 22 || Twins || 7–5 || Narveson (6–4) || Baker (6–6) || Axford (5)|| 36,595 || 30–40
|- align="center" bgcolor="bbffbb"
| 71 || June 23 || Twins || 5–3 || Parra (2–5) || Liriano (6–5) || Axford (6) || 33,362 || 31–40
|- align="center" bgcolor="bbffbb"
| 72 || June 24 || Twins || 5–0 || Gallardo (7–3) || Blackburn (6–5) || || 35,898 || 32–40
|- align="center" bgcolor="bbffbb"
| 73 || June 25 || Mariners || 8–3 || Bush (3–5) || Rowland-Smith (1–7) || || 30,087 || 33–40
|- align="center" bgcolor="ffbbbb"
| 74 || June 26 || Mariners || 5–4 || Sweeney (1–0) || Wolf (5–7) || League (2) || 41,655 || 33–41
|- align="center" bgcolor="bbffbb"
| 75 || June 27 || Mariners || 3–0 || Narveson (7–4) || Vargas (6–3) || Axford (7) || 41,995 || 34–41
|- align="center" bgcolor="ffbbbb"
| 76 || June 28 || Astros || 9–5 || Chacín (1–0) || Coffey (2–2) || || 27,908 || 34–42
|- align="center" bgcolor="bbffbb"
| 77 || June 29 || Astros || 7–5 || Gallardo (8–3) || Myers (5–6) || Axford (8) || 32,907 || 35–42
|- align="center" bgcolor="ffbbbb"
| 78 || June 30 || Astros || 5–1 || Rodríguez (5–10) || Bush (3–6) || || 30,114 || 35–43

|- align="center" bgcolor="bbffbb"
| 79 || July 1 || @ Cardinals || 4–1 || Wolf (6–7) || Hawksworth (2–5) || Axford (9) || 40,302 || 36–43
|- align="center" bgcolor="ffbbbb"
| 80 || July 2 || @ Cardinals || 5–0 || García (8–4) || Narveson (7–5) || || 43,028 || 36–44
|- align="center" bgcolor="bbffbb"
| 81 || July 3 || @ Cardinals || 12–5 || Parra (3–5) || Carpenter (9–2) || || 43,276 || 37–44
|- align="center" bgcolor="ffbbbb"
| 82 || July 4 || @ Cardinals || 7–1 || Wainwright (12–5) || Gallardo (8–4) || || 38,581 || 37–45
|- align="center" bgcolor="ffbbbb"
| 83 || July 5 || Giants || 6–1 || Sánchez (7–6) || Loe (0–1) || || 36,185 || 37–46
|- align="center" bgcolor="ffbbbb"
| 84 || July 6 || Giants || 6–1 || Bumgarner (1–2) || Wolf (6–8) || || 30,896 || 37–47
|- align="center" bgcolor="ffbbbb"
| 85 || July 7 || Giants || 15–2 || Lincecum (9–4) || Narveson (7–6) || || 29,387 || 37–48
|- align="center" bgcolor="ffbbbb"
| 86 || July 8 || Giants || 9–3 || Runzler (3–0) || Parra (3–6) || || 34,590 || 37–49
|- align="center" bgcolor="bbffbb"
| 87 || July 9 || Pirates || 5–4 (10) || Axford (4–1) || Meek (4–3) || || 27,767 || 38–49
|- align="center" bgcolor="bbffbb"
| 88 || July 10 || Pirates || 4–3 || Bush (4–6) || Karstens (2–4) || Axford (10) || 38,588 || 39–49
|- align="center" bgcolor="bbffbb"
| 89 || July 11 || Pirates || 6–5 || Axford (5–1) || Dotel (2–2) || || 34,598 || 40–49
|- align="center" bgcolor="ffbbbb"
| 90 || July 15 || @ Braves || 2–1 || Jurrjens (2–3) || Bush (4–7) || Wagner (21) || 35,057 || 40–50
|- align="center" bgcolor="bbffbb"
| 91 || July 16 || @ Braves || 9–3 || Wolf (7–8) || Hanson (8–6) || || 37,014 || 41–50
|- align="center" bgcolor="bbffbb"
| 92 || July 17 || @ Braves || 6–3 || Narveson (8–6) || Hudson (9–5) || Axford (11) || 48,174 || 42–50
|- align="center"  bgcolor="ffbbbb"
| 93 || July 18 || @ Braves || 11–6 || Lowe (10–8) || Parra (3–7) || || 24,732 || 42–51
|- align="center" bgcolor="bbffbb"
| 94 || July 19 || @ Pirates || 3–1 || Capuano (1–1) || Karstens (2–5) || Axford (12) || 12,375 || 43–51
|- align="center" bgcolor="ffbbbb"
| 95 || July 20 || @ Pirates || 11–9 || Carrasco (2–2) || Bush (4–8) || Dotel (20) || 13,202 || 43–52
|- align="center" bgcolor="ffbbbb"
| 96 || July 21 || @ Pirates || 15–3 || Duke (4–9) || Wolf (7–9) || || 13,532 || 43–53
|- align="center" bgcolor="bbffbb"
| 97 || July 22 || @ Pirates || 3–2 || Gallardo (9–4) || Ohlendorf (1–8) || Axford (13) || 18,715 || 44–53
|- align="center" bgcolor="bbffbb"
| 98 || July 23 || Nationals || 7–5 || Loe (1–1) || Burnett (0–5) || Axford (14) || 34,822 || 45–53
|- align="center" bgcolor="bbffbb"
| 99 || July 24 || Nationals || 4–3 || Axford (6–1) || Storen (2–2) || || 41,987 || 46–53
|- align="center" bgcolor="bbffbb"
| 100 || July 25 || Nationals || 8–3 || Bush (5–8) || Detwiler (0–1) || || 42,414 || 47–53
|- align="center" bgcolor="bbffbb"
| 101 || July 26 || Reds || 3–2 || Villanueva (1–0) || Arroyo (10–6) || Axford (15) || 31,945 || 48–53
|- align="center" bgcolor="ffbbbb"
| 102 || July 27 || Reds || 12–4 || Ondrusek (2–0) || Gallardo (9–5) || || 32,286 || 48–54
|- align="center" bgcolor="ffbbbb"
| 103 || July 28 || Reds || 10–2 || Wood (1–1) || Narveson (8–7) || || 38,365 || 48–55
|- align="center" bgcolor="ffbbbb"
| 104 || July 30 || @ Astros || 5–0 || Happ (2–0) || Parra (3–8) || || 27,456 || 48–56
|- align="center" bgcolor="ffbbbb"
| 105 || July 31 || @ Astros || 6–0 || Rodríguez (9–11) || Bush (5–9) || || 38,824 || 48–57

|- align="center" bgcolor="ffbbbb"
| 106 || August 1 || @ Astros || 5–2 || Wright (1–1) || Loe (1–2) || Lyon (2) || 27,964 || 48–58
|- align="center" bgcolor="bbffbb"
| 107 || August 2 || @ Cubs || 18–1 || Gallardo (10–5) || Wells (5–9) || || 37,731 || 49–58
|- align="center" bgcolor="bbffbb"
| 108 || August 3 || @ Cubs || 4–3 || Narveson (9–7) || Diamond (0–1) || Axford (16) || 36,183 || 50–58
|- align="center" bgcolor="ffbbbb"
| 109 || August 4 || @ Cubs || 15–3 || Dempster (9–8) || Parra (3–9) || || 38,425 || 50–59
|- align="center" bgcolor="bbffbb"
| 110 || August 6 || Astros || 6–5 || Loe (2–2) || Lindstrom (2–2) || || 33,952 || 51–59
|- align="center" bgcolor="bbffbb"
| 111 || August 7 || Astros || 5–2 || Wolf (8–9) || Myers (8–7) || Hoffman (6) || 39,410 || 52–59
|- align="center" bgcolor="bbffbb"
| 112 || August 8 || Astros || 11–6 || Gallardo (11–5) || Wright (1–2) || || 39,339 || 53–59
|- align="center" bgcolor="ffbbbb"
| 113 || August 9 || Diamondbacks || 7–4 (10) || Demel (1–0) || Hoffman (2–5) || Heilman (6) || 29,633 || 53–60
|- align="center" bgcolor="ffbbbb"
| 114 || August 10 || Diamondbacks || 2–1 || Boyer (3–2) || Capuano (1–2) || Demel (1) || 35,029 || 53–61
|- align="center" bgcolor="ffbbbb"
| 115 || August 11 || Diamondbacks || 8–2 || Hudson (4–1) || Bush (5–10) || || 29,611 || 53–62
|- align="center" bgcolor="bbffbb"
| 116 || August 12 || Diamondbacks || 8–4 || Wolf (9–9) || López (5–11) || Axford (17) || 34,808 || 54–62
|- align="center" bgcolor="ffbbbb"
| 117 || August 13 || @ Rockies || 5–4 || Buchholz (1–0) || Loe (2–3) || Street (8) || 39,142 || 54–63
|- align="center" bgcolor="bbffbb"
| 118 || August 14 || @ Rockies || 5–4 (10) || Axford (7–1) || Street (2–4) || || 45,264 || 55–63
|- align="center" bgcolor="ffbbbb"
| 119 || August 15 || @ Rockies || 6–5 || Betancourt (2–1) || Hoffman (2–6) || || 48,133 || 55–64
|- align="center" bgcolor="bbffbb"
| 120 || August 17 || @ Cardinals || 3–2 || Bush (6–10) || García (10–6) || Axford (18) || 45,380 || 56–64
|- align="center" bgcolor="bbffbb"
| 121 || August 18 || @ Cardinals || 3–2 || Wolf (10–9) || Wainwright (17–7) || Hoffman (8) || 41,400 || 57–64
|- align="center" bgcolor="bbffbb"
| 122 || August 20 || Padres || 10–6 || Capuano (2–2) || LeBlanc (7–11) || || 27,976 || 58–64
|- align="center"  bgcolor="bbffbb"
| 123 || August 21 || Padres || 6–5 || McClendon (1–0) || Correia (10–8) || Axford (19) || 40,056 || 59–64
|- align="center" bgcolor="ffbbbb"
| 124 || August 22 || Padres || 7–3 || Garland (13–8) || Parra (3–10) || || 32,126 || 59–65
|- align="center" bgcolor="ffbbbb"
| 125 || August 24 || Dodgers || 5–3 || Lilly (8–8) || Bush (6–11) || Kuo (5) || 39,055 || 59–66
|- align="center" bgcolor="ffbbbb"
| 126 || August 25 || Dodgers || 5–4 || Kuroda (9–11) || Wolf (10–10) || Dotel (22) || 30,545 || 59–67
|- align="center" bgcolor="ffbbbb"
| 127 || August 26 || Dodgers || 7–1 || Belisario (2–1) || Gallardo (11–6) || || 32,333 || 59–68
|- align="center" bgcolor="bbffbb"
| 128 || August 27 || Pirates || 7–2 || Narveson (10–7) || McDonald (2–4) || || 32,130 || 60–68
|- align="center" bgcolor="bbffbb"
| 129 || August 28 || Pirates || 8–7 (11) || Loe (3–3) || Ledezma (0–1) || || 37,782 || 61–68
|- align="center" bgcolor="bbffbb"
| 130 || August 29 || Pirates || 8–4 || Bush (7–11) || Morton (1–10) || Hoffman (8) || 35,733 || 62–68
|- align="center" bgcolor="ffbbbb"
| 131 || August 30 || @ Reds || 5–4 (10) || Cordero (5–4) || Hoffman (2–7)|| || 14,589 || 62–69
|- align="center" bgcolor="ffbbbb"
| 132 || August 31 || @ Reds || 8–4 || LeCure (2–4) || Gallardo (11–7) || || 19,218 || 62–70

|- align="center" bgcolor="ffbbbb"
| 133 || September 1 || @ Reds || 6–1 || Chapman (1–0) || Coffey (2–3) || || 16,412 || 62–71
|- align="center" bgcolor="ffbbbb"
| 134 || September 3 || @ Phillies || 1–0 || Hamels (9–10) || Capuano (2–3) || Madson (5) || 44,570 || 62–72
|- align="center"  bgcolor="ffbbbb"
| 135 || September 4 || @ Phillies || 5–4 || Halladay (17–10) || Loe (3–4) || Lidge (20) || 45,393 || 62–73
|- align="center" bgcolor="bbffbb"
| 136 || September 5 || @ Phillies || 6–2 || Wolf (11–10) || Kendrick (9–8) || Axford (20) || 45,006 || 63–73
|- align="center" bgcolor="ffbbbb"
| 137 || September 6 || Cardinals || 8–6 || Boggs (2–2) || Braddock (1–2) || || 35,190 || 63–74
|- align="center" bgcolor="bbffbb"
| 138 || September 7 || Cardinals || 4–2 || Narveson (11–7) || Lohse (2–7) || Hoffman (9, career #600) || 33,149 || 64–74
|- align="center" bgcolor="bbffbb"
| 139 || September 8 || Cardinals || 8–1 || Capuano (3–3) || García (13–7) || || 34,298 || 65–74
|- align="center" bgcolor="ffbbbb"
| 140 || September 10 || Cubs || 4–0 || Zambrano (8–6) || Bush (7–12) || Mármol (29) || 30,975 || 65–75
|- align="center" bgcolor="ffbbbb"
| 141 || September 11 || Cubs || 1–0 || Dempster (13–10) || Wolf (11–11) || Mármol (30) || 41,463 || 65–76
|- align="center" bgcolor="bbffbb"
| 142 || September 12 || Cubs || 2–0 || Gallardo (12–7) || Coleman (1–2) || Axford (21) || 37,317 || 66–76
|- align="center" bgcolor="ffbbbb"
| 143 || September 13 || @ Astros || 4–2 || Myers (12–7) || Kintzler (0–1) || Lindstrom (23) || 31,342 || 66–77
|- align="center" bgcolor="ffbbbb"
| 144 || September 14 || @ Astros || 3–2 || Norris (8–8) || Capuano (3–4) || Lyon (16) || 33,878 || 66–78
|- align="center" bgcolor="bbffbb"
| 145 || September 15 || @ Astros || 8–6 (10) || Axford (8–1) || Lindstrom (2–5) || || 30,791 || 67–78
|- align="center" bgcolor="bbffbb"
| 146 || September 17 || @ Giants || 3–0 || Wolf (12–11) || Bumgarner (5–6) || || 41,835 || 68–78
|- align="center" bgcolor="bbffbb"
| 147 || September 18 || @ Giants || 2–1 || Gallardo (13–7) || Lincecum (14–10) || Axford (22) || 41,767 || 69–78
|- align="center" bgcolor="ffbbbb"
| 148 || September 19 || @ Giants || 9–2 || Zito (9–13) || Narveson (11–8) || || 41,113 || 69–79
|- align="center" bgcolor="ffbbbb"
| 149 || September 20 || Reds || 5–2 || Masset (4–4) || Loe (3–5) || Cordero (37) || 30,024 || 69–80
|- align="center" bgcolor="ffbbbb"
| 150 || September 21 || Reds || 4–3 || Vólquez (4–3) || Bush (7–13) || Cordero (38) || 22,761 || 69–81
|- align="center" bgcolor="bbffbb"
| 151 || September 22 || Reds || 13–1 || Wolf (13–11) || Cueto (12–6) || || 27,004 || 70–81
|- align="center" bgcolor="bbffbb"
| 152 || September 23 || Marlins || 8–3 || Gallardo (14–7) || Sánchez (12–11) || || 31,212 || 71–81
|- align="center" bgcolor="bbffbb"
| 153 || September 24 || Marlins || 6–2 || Jeffress (1–0) || Miller (1–4) || || 32,235 || 72–81
|- align="center" bgcolor="ffbbbb"
| 154 || September 25 || Marlins || 4–0 || Volstad (11–9) || Narveson (11–9) || || 34,325 || 72–82
|- align="center" bgcolor="bbffbb"
| 155 || September 26 || Marlins || 7–1 || Capuano (4–4) || Méndez (1–2) || || 29,059 || 73–82
|- align="center" bgcolor="bbbbbb"
| – || September 27 || @ Mets || colspan=6 | Postponed (rain) Rescheduled for September 29
|- align="center" bgcolor="ffbbbb"
| 156 || September 28 || @ Mets || 4–3 || Dessens (4–2) || Axford (8–2) || || 24,666 || 73–83
|- align="center" bgcolor="bbffbb"
| 157 || September 29 || @ Mets || 8–7 || Villanueva (2–0) || Acosta (3–2) || Axford (23) || 22,500 || 74–83
|- align="center" bgcolor="bbffbb"
| 158 || September 29 || @ Mets || 3–1 || Bush (8–13) || Dickey (11–9) || Hoffman (10) || 28,280 || 75–83
|- align="center" bgcolor="bbffbb"
| 159 || September 30 || @ Mets || 9–2 || Narveson (12–9) || Gee (2–2) || || 24,661 || 76–83
|- align="center" bgcolor="bbffbb"
| 160 || October 1 || @ Reds || 4–3 (11) || McClendon (2–0) || LeCure (2–5) || Axford (24) || 28,844 || 77–83
|- align="center" bgcolor="ffbbbb"
| 161 || October 2 || @ Reds || 7–4 || Ondrusek (5–0) || Coffey (2–4) || Cordero (39) || 28,173 || 77–84
|- align="center" bgcolor="ffbbbb"
| 162 || October 3 || @ Reds || 3–2 || Maloney (2–2) || Wolf (13–12) || Cordero (40) || 37,582 || 77–85

|   

Source:

Roster

Player stats

Batting

Starters by position
Note: Pos = Position; G = Games played; AB = At bats; H = Hits; Avg. = Batting average; HR = Home runs; RBI = Runs batted in

Through October 3, 2010

Other batters
Note: G = Games played; AB = At bats; H = Hits; Avg. = Batting average; HR = Home runs; RBI = Runs batted in

Through October 3, 2010

Pitching

Starting and other pitchers
Note: G = Games pitched; GS = Games started; IP = Innings pitched; W = Wins; L = Losses; ERA = Earned run average; SO = Strikeouts; WHIP = Walks+hits per inning pitched

Through October 3, 2010

Relief pitchers
Note: G = Games pitched; W = Wins; L = Losses; SV = Saves; IP = Innings pitched; ERA = Earned run average; SO = Strikeouts; WHIP = Walks+hits per inning pitched

Through October 3, 2010

Farm system

The Brewers' farm system consisted of seven minor league affiliates in 2010. The Helena Brewers won the Pioneer League championship, and the AZL Brewers won the Arizona League championship.

References

External links

2010 Milwaukee Brewers season at Baseball Reference
Milwaukee Brewers 2010 Schedule at MLB.com

Milwaukee Brewers seasons
Milwaukee Brewers
Milwaukee Brew